The Munda Biddi Trail is a long-distance mostly off-road cycling trail in Western Australia. The completed Munda Biddi Trail opened end-to-end in April 2013 when it claimed the title of the longest continuous off-road cycling trail of its kind in the world.

Etymology
The name Munda Biddi means "path through the forest" in the Noongar Aboriginal language, and it runs largely through an undeveloped natural corridor. The track traverses vast areas of unspoiled forests and bushland with mostly gentle terrain. While the track is open year-round  riding conditions are better during spring and autumn, and potentially hazardous from December to March because of the often extreme heat and fire danger at that time of year.

Records
The record for completing the Munda Biddi Trail (South to North) is two days, seventeen hours and 22 minutes, set by Craig Wiggins on 25th October, 2020. The female record for completing the Munda Biddi Trail (South to North) was set by Sacha Dowell on 28th September 2021, with a time of three days, fifteen hours and 43 minutes.The previous records were three days, sixteen hours and 17 minutes, set by Callum Henderson in October 2020, and four days, six hours and 39 minutes, set by Declan von Dietze in 2017. 

Sections of the trail vary in terms of their difficulty and terrain type but it has stages suitable for everyone's cycling ability and pace. The trail is easily accessible by car, and riders can begin their journey from multiple locations. There are free campsites at various points along the trail, some with more than a day's ride between them. Detailed maps of the trail are available.

In April 2012, geocaches were placed throughout the Munda Biddi Trail.

Foundation
The trail is run by the Munda Biddi Trail Foundation, a not-for-profit organisation which was formed to assist the Department of Environment and Conservation and other land managers get the trail project off the ground.  The foundation continues to be involved in trail development and planning, including managing volunteers, delivering events and trip planning, among other activities.

Stages and Maps
Stage 1 - Mundaring to Collie
   Map 1.    Mundaring to Jarrahdale
   Map 2.    Jarrahdale to Nanga 
   Map 3.    Nanga to Collie

Stage 2 - Collie to Northcliffe 
   Map 4.    Collie to Jarrahwood 
   Map 5.    Jarrahwood to Manjimup
   Map 6.    Manjimup - Northcliffe

Stage 3 - Northcliffe to Albany

   Map 7.    Northcliffe - Walpole
   Map 8.    Walpole - Denmark
   Map 9.    Denmark - Albany

See also

 Bibbulmun Track
 Long-distance trails in Australia

References

Further reading

External links
  Munda Biddi Trail Foundation
 Getting to and from the Munda Bindi
Hiking and bushwalking tracks in Western Australia
Cycleways in Australia
Shire of Mundaring
Southwest Australia